St. Camillus Centre is an organization in Mohale's Hoek, Lesotho founded in 2002 by Sebastian Khoarai, a bishop, and Juliana Manele, a nun, both members of the Congregation of the Sisters of the Holy Cross.

The first case of AIDS in Lesotho was discovered in 1986.  Early efforts to address the spread of HIV were thwarted by poor organization and a lack of resources.  By the early 2000s, the AIDS epidemic in Lesotho had grown to alarming proportions and the death rate had skyrocketed.  The public was inadequately informed about how the disease spread and how transmission could be prevented.  As the infection and death rate grew, stigmatization and discrimination of the ill grew too.  Though government programs were being designed to address this health crisis, mobilization of the resources to implement the programs was lagging. Non-government organizations (NGOs) and foreign government programs were bringing aid, but almost 90% of Lesotho's population was scattered in remote rural areas that were difficult to reach and often out of range of aid programs.  New strategies were needed to reach the affected people.

2002 – 2007 Mobilization

The Saint Camillus Centre began in 2002 when a collaborative effort among a coalition of Congregation of the Sisters of the Holy Cross, the Ministries of Health and Agriculture, and NGOs such as Irish Aide began a grass roots effort to address the rising number of Basotho suffering from AIDS related illnesses.  The number of PLWHA in Lesotho had skyrocketed to 240,000; adult prevalence was over 30%, and the death toll was well over 25,000.

Expanding services

In 2004 the Lesotho government introduced new care services to its citizens.  Free HIV counseling and testing began in March 2004 with the “Know Your Status” program and in November 2004 free antiretroviral therapy (ART) was offered to the public.  The government also planned to train 3,600 community health workers to provide HIV counseling and testing, though just over seven hundred had been identified by October 2006.  With severely limited numbers of health care professionals and significant challenges to reaching remote villages, only about 8,400 HIV positive Basotho were on ART by the end of 2005 and only 2% of the target population had been tested for HIV by August 2007.

Shelter for children

Ground was broken in early 2014 on a small pasture at the farm that was previously leased to St. Camillus by Khoarai (retired 2014).  Construction continued up until the fourth quarter of 2014. The Congregation of the Sisters of the Holy Cross contributed the funding necessary to make the new structure a home for the children; they bought sheets and blankets for the new beds and the supplies to complete the finishing touches such as paint as plaster.  Once completed as designed, seventeen children, ages twelve months to seventeen years, and four matrons moved in on December 23, 2014.

The children's home has two large dorms, two private rooms with baths for the matrons, two large bathrooms in each dorm, and a large central kitchen and common area. The grounds outside have raised garden beds for flowers and vegetables, numerous young fruit and nut trees as well as wind-breaker trees along the perimeter. In addition there is a small plaza in front and an open area for the children to play.  The home is surrounded by the farm's vegetable gardens and only a short walk from the peach orchard, chicken coops, and other domestic animals.

See also
Roman Catholic Diocese of Mohale's Hoek

References

Organisations based in Lesotho
Christian organizations established in 2002
2002 establishments in Lesotho